This article is about the demographic features of the population of Denmark, including ethnicity, education level, health of the populace, economic status, religious affiliations, and other aspects of the population.

Population
Since 1980, the number of people of Danish descent, defined as having at least one parent who was born in Denmark and has Danish citizenship, has remained constant at around 5 million in Denmark, and nearly all the population growth from 5.1 up to the 2018 total of 5.8 million was due to immigration.

Demographic statistics according to the World Population Review in 2019.
One birth every 8 minutes	
One death every 9 minutes	
One net migrant every 34 minutes	
Net gain of one person every 24 minutes

Fertility 
The natural growth of the population (births minus deaths) was negative in 2022, that is, minus 1005 people. The last time there was a negative natural increase in the population was in 1988. During 2022, 58,430 children were born, 5,043 fewer than in 2021. In 2022, 59,435 people died, there were 2,283, or 4.0% more than in 2021. The total population in the age group 80 and over grew by 12,844 people, or 4.4%., from 2022 to 2023.

During 2022, the Danish population grew by 59,234 people, so the population on January 1, 2023 consisted of 5,932,654 people. It was a population increase of 1.0 percent, which is higher than in 2021, when the population increase was 0.6 percent.

In 2022, it is the first time in history that immigrant women from non-Western countries now have fewer children on average than women of Danish roots in Denmark. On average, immigrant women have 1.76 children, the descendants have an average of 1.75 children, while women of Danish roots have 1.78 children. This is because Ukrainians, who are categorized as non-Western, have come to Denmark in large numbers.

In the same year, immigrant women from Syria had the highest TFR in Denmark, they give birth to an average of 3.7 children. They are followed by women from Somalia and Pakistan, 2020 figures show.

Denmark had a total fertility rate of 1.55 children per woman in 2022.

In 2021 the number of childless women in their 50s is the highest in seven years; 12.3 percent of women at that age have never had a child, while the 19.5 percent of 50-year-old men do not have children.

Historical fertility rates

The total fertility rate is the number of children born per woman. It is based on fairly good data for the entire period. Sources: Our World In Data and Gapminder Foundation.

Total fertility rate

1.78 children born/woman (2018 est.) Country comparison to the world: 152nd

Average age of the mother at her first birth
In 2021 the average age of the mother at her first birth in Denmark was of 31.4 years, and the father is of 31.5 years.

Life expectancy 
Sources: Our World In Data and the United Nations.

1775–1950

1950–2015

Age structure 
0-14 years: 16.57% (male 493,829 /female 468,548)
15-24 years: 12.67% (male 377,094 /female 358,807)
25-54 years: 39.03% (male 1,147,196 /female 1,119,967)
55-64 years: 12.33% (male 356,860 /female 359,264)
65 years and over: 19.42% (male 518,200 /female 609,737) (2018 est.)

 Median age

 total: 41.9 years. Country comparison to the world: 35th
 male: 40.8 years
 female: 42.9 years (2018 est.)

Ethnic and origin groups

Non-indigenous ethnic minorities include:
 Afghans
 Inuit (Greenlandic) from the territory of Greenland
 Turks
 Arabs (i.e. Palestinians, followed by Moroccans, Syrians, Lebanese, Yemenis, Egyptians, Iraqis and Jordanians)
 Vietnamese
 Thai
 Jews
 Chinese
 Pakistanis (including Pashtuns)
 Iranians
 Somalis
 Ethiopians
 Sudanese
 Indians
 Chileans (the most numerous of Latin American nationalities)
 Bosniaks
 Poles
 Albanians
 Bangladeshis
 Roma
 Filipinos

Historic minorities
Ethnic minorities in Denmark include a handful of groups:

 Approximately 15,000 people in Denmark belong to a German minority traditionally referred to as hjemmetyskere meaning "domestic Germans" in Danish, and as Nordschleswiger in German. This minority of Germans hold Danish citizenship and self-identify as Germans. Many of them speak German or Low German as their home language. There are also several thousand German citizens and other ethnic Germans residing in Denmark with no historical connection to this group.
 An estimated 23,000 people in Denmark proper are ethnic Faroese, while 19,000 Greenlanders reside permanently in Denmark. Many of these use the Faroese and Greenlandic languages, respectively, as their first language. All residents of the Kingdom (viz. Denmark proper, the Faroe Islands and Greenland) holds Danish citizenship, unless they inherit or otherwise receive a foreign citizenship.
 The Danish Jews number around 6,000 in 2020 according to the organisation Jewish Community in Denmark, around 1,700 being card-carrying members of the organisation.
 There are close to 10,000 Roma in Denmark.

Modern minorities
In the modern minorities, Statistics Denmark counts first-generation immigrants, second-generation (Descendants in Danish statistics classification) and third-generation (Children of descendants in Danish classification). Children of descendants can be either of "Danish origin" (if both of their parents were born in Denmark with Danish citizenship) and of "foreign origin" (if one of their parents is a second-generation immigrant and another first-generation). Therefore, this table included all people of the respective background, people who are classified as of "foreign background" and third-generation immigrants, who classified as of "Danish origin". Statistics Denmark denotes an immigrant's group based on their country of birth, it does this usually off of the immigrant or descendents parents, if only one such parent is known, then the group is determined by that or if no parents are known then it is assumed if the person is a immigrant that their country of origin is their country of birth.

Statistics Denmark also has specific classification bands which it uses to separate different immigrant groups. As an example, for 'Western' immigrants and 'Non-western', the classification band is as follows:

 Western countries: All 28 EU countries and Andorra, Iceland, Liechtenstein, Monaco, Norway, San Marino, Switzerland, Vatican State, Canada, USA, Australia and New Zealand.
 Non-western countries; All other countries.
According to 2021 figures from Statistics Denmark, 86%  of Denmark's population of over 5,840,045 was of Danish descent.  The remaining 14% were of a foreign background, defined as immigrants or descendants of recent immigrants. With the same definition, the most common countries of origin were Turkey, Poland, Germany, Iraq, Romania, Syria, Somalia, Iran, Afghanistan, and Yugoslavia and its successor states.
More than 817,438 individuals (14%) are migrants and their descendants (199,668 second generation migrants born in Denmark).

Of these 817,438 immigrants and their descendants:
 294,798 (36.1%) have a Western background (Norway, Germany, Bosnia and Herzegovina, UK, Poland, Romania and Iceland; definition: EU countries, non-EU Nordic countries, Andorra, Liechtenstein, Monaco, San Marino, Switzerland, Vatican State, Canada, USA, Australia and New Zealand).
 522,640 (63.9%) have a non-Western background (Turkey, Iraq, Iran, Pakistan, Thailand and Somalia; all other countries).

There were 121,183 immigrants in 2022, of these 31,381 were Ukrainian citizens, people with Ukrainian citizenship accounted for 26 percent of all immigration. The total population of Denmark increased in 2022 by 59,234 people, and the net immigration of Ukrainian people amounted to 45 percent of this population growth.

Vital statistics 

Data according to Statistics Denmark, which collects the official statistics for Denmark.

Note. Population as of 31 December.

In 2021, 79% of all births were to mothers of Danish origin, 17% from immigrants and 4% from descendants of immigrants.

Current vital statistics

Religion

The Church of Denmark is state-supported and, according to statistics from January 2022, accounts for the religious affiliation of 73.2% of the population. Denmark has had religious freedom guaranteed since 1849 by the Constitution, and numerous other religions are officially recognised, including several Christian denominations, Muslim, Jewish, Buddhist, Hindu and other congregations as well as Forn Siðr, a revival of Scandinavian pagan tradition. The Department of Ecclesiastical Affairs recognises roughly a hundred religious congregations for tax and legal purposes such as conducting wedding ceremonies.

Islam is the second largest religion in Denmark. In 2020, an estimated 4.4% of the Danish population were Muslims.

For historical reasons, there is a formal distinction between 'approved' and 'recognised' congregations of faith. The latter include 11 traditional denominations, such as Roman Catholics, the Reformed Church, the Mosaic Congregation, Methodists and Baptists, some of whose privileges in the country date hundreds of years back. These have the additional rights of having priests appointed by royal resolution and to christen/name children with legal effect.

Religions

Evangelical Lutheran (official) 74.8%, Muslim 5.3%, other (denominations of less than 1% each, include Roman Catholic, Jehovah's Witness, Serbian Orthodox Christian, Jewish, Baptist, and Buddhist) 19.9% (2017 est.)

Employment and income

Unemployment, youth ages 15–24
total: 12% (2016 est.) Country comparison to the world: 109th
male: 13.1% (2016 est.)
female: 10.9% (2016 est.)

Taxation and benefits

Although the level of taxation in Denmark is among the highest in the world, the labor market participation rate is still high compared with other western countries. Municipal income tax makes up the largest part of taxation in Denmark, with central government income tax topping it up. These income taxes are higher than in other OECD countries. These direct taxes make up two thirds of the taxation on private households with indirect taxes of the central government, and municipalities (property tax), making up one third, i.e. with motor vehicles (passenger cars, motorcycles, commercial vehicles) sold from VAT registered dealerships - because of the registration fee - being among the most expensive in the world, with prices in Norway at the same level, and the most expensive in Singapore. Also VAT in Denmark is not reduced from the current 25%. The 25% are paid on all goods and services where VAT is applied. Indirect taxes are about average compared with other European OECD countries. Payroll taxes (Danish sociale afgifter) are much lower than in other OECD countries. The tax structure ensures a broad tax base across the whole population. Revenue from corporate taxes is lower compared with other European countries. Municipalities and the central government (regions are not allowed to levy any taxes, as they are financed by central government and municipal block grants)  redistribute a large amount of their tax income in transfer payments to municipalities with a low tax base and/or few tax payers. It is normal for children to be in nurseries, which requires a partial payment of the costs or is free of charge for low income households, and in kindergartens owned and operated, or financed, by the public sector. Child benefit is paid to parents for each child.

See also 

 Religion in Denmark
 List of urban areas in the Nordic countries

Notes

References

External links

 Danish Demes Regional DNA Project
 National statistics
 Ministry of Ecclesiastical Affairs - List of recognised denominations (in Danish)
 Statistic info on recognised denominations (in Danish; Muslim congregations not listed)
 Interactive population pyramid 1980-2060 or